Thomaston Castle is a medieval castle located west of Maybole, South Ayrshire, Scotland. It looks much as it did hundreds of years ago. Little has changed, except for the addition of a house located on the property. The castle is run down and has debris falling in on it.

Thomaston Castle was originally built in the 13th century for a nephew of Robert The Bruce, and first owned by Alan McIlvaine (b. 1500 in Ayrshire) whose family supplied wine to the Earls Kennedy, owners of nearby Culzean Castle. Upon his death, Thomaston passed to Patrick McIlvaine on his marriage to Isobel Kennedy, a daughter of Gilbert Kennedy, 3rd Earl of Cassilis.

References

Further reading

External links

 Artist's impression and photos of Thomaston
 Thomaston Castle | Scottish Castles Association
 Thomaston Castle from The Gazetteer for Scotland

Castles in South Ayrshire
Listed castles in Scotland
Tower houses in Scotland
Scheduled monuments in Scotland
Scheduled Ancient Monuments in South Ayrshire